Biba Dhaka is a village in Khyber-Pakhtunkhwa. It is located at 34°8'25N 73°10'25E with an altitude of 1502 metres (4931 feet). Neighbouring settlements include Jabrian, Darah and Batangi.

References

Villages in Khyber Pakhtunkhwa